The 1947 Macdonald Brier, the Canadian men's national curling championship, was held from March 3 to 6, 1947 at Saint John Arena in Saint John, New Brunswick.

Team Manitoba, who was skipped by Jimmy Welsh won the Brier Tankard after finishing round robin play unbeaten with a 9-0 record. This was Manitoba's eleventh Brier championship and the fifth time in which a team finished the Brier unbeaten. British Columbia and Saskatchewan finished round robin play tied for second with 6-3 records, necessitating a tiebreaker playoff for runner-up where British Columbia would beat Saskatchewan 10-9.

Teams
The teams are listed as follows:

Round robin standings

Round robin results

Draw 1

Draw 2

Draw 3

Draw 4

Draw 5

Draw 6

Draw 7

Draw 8

Draw 9

Playoff

References 

Macdonald Brier, 1947
Macdonald Brier, 1947
The Brier
Curling competitions in Saint John, New Brunswick
Macdonald Brier
Macdonald Brier